Azmeri Sultana Bipasha widely known as Peya Bipasha is a Bangladeshi actress and model who was a participant of the country's leading beauty pageant Lux Channel I Superstar in 2012. Peya came under the media limelight when she first appeared in a television commercial 'Cholo Bohudur' of leading telecom company Grameen Phone. Peya Bipasha was born and brought up in  Dhaka, Bangladesh. She has been very passionate about media arena from her early childhood and that helped her building up career in the certain field.

Peya Bipasha kicked off the journey in the showbiz arena as a billboard model. She got huge attention around the country after appearing as a model for the billboard advertisement of Vaseline by Unilever Company. The billboard was placed in 5500 different spots around the country. She got further acclamation with her appearance in the television commercial of Grameen Phone.

The talented actress also performs in television dramas; she made her debut in acting with the drama Ditio Matra with Tahsan Rahman Khan. Then she appeared in the drama Trade Fair and made a wonderful performance. Peya Bipasha also made a terrific acting performance in the dramas Somoyer Golpo Osomoyer Sopno and Oshomapto Valobasha.

Early life and study
Peya Bipasha was so much passionate about media arena from early childhood eventually build up her career in the certain field. Peya completed HSC from Siddeshwari Girls College. Peya Bipasha was married. She also has a daughter.

Career
The actress comes to the timeline around the country when she appeared in a television commercial ‘Cholo Bohudur’ by leading telecom company Grameen Phone. After reached the top ten in the beauty pageant, she left the competition but her elder sister Azmeri Asha became the first runner-up in the same competition.

Peya Bipasha's first work as a model was with Aarong. From that onwards, she never had to look back. Later she worked for Ecstasy, Cats Eye, and most of the top brands of Bangladesh. She was a brand ambassador of Unilever for a year. During that time, she was heavily involved in Billboard, Magazine and Ramp Modelling.

Peya Bipasha then start working for TV commercials (TVC). Her first TVC was Polar Ice Cream. She had done numbers of TVC with Grameen Phone, Ispahani Cha, Parachute Narikel Tel, Frooto Mango Juice, Olympic T20 biscuits, Fresh Soyabean Tel and many more. Though, Peya Bipasha got the nationwide attention after doing TVC (Television commercial) “Cholo Bohudur” by Grameenphone.

The talented actress also performs in television dramas; she made her debut acting in the drama Ditiyo Matra with Tahsan Rahman Khan. Then she appeared in the drama Trade Fair and made a wonderful performance. Peya Bipasha also made a terrific acting performance in the dramas Somoyer Golp Osomoyer Sopno and Osamapto Vhalobasha.

Television

Short films

Music videos
 Cholo Bohudur
 Fire Asho Na
 Tumi Amar
 Hariye Fela Bhalobasha
 Jitbe Dhaka Dekhbe Desh (Dhaka Dynamites Official Theme Song)

TV commercials
 Grameenphone
 Ispahani Tea
 Parachute Coconut Oil
 Frooto Mango Juice
 Olympic T20 Biscuit
 Fresh Soyabean Oil
 Detos Chips
 Infinity Mega Mall
 Topper Cookware
 Click Iron
 Pran Lacchi

References

Further reading

External links
 

21st-century Bangladeshi actresses
Living people
1995 births
Bangladeshi television actresses
People from Khulna